Neila is a feminine given name. Notable people with the name include:

 Neila Gonji (born 1959), Tunisian politician
 Neila Sathyalingam (1938–2017), Singaporean classical Indian dancer, choreographer, and instructor

See also
 Nella
 Neil

Feminine given names